Tartu University Hospital Children's Foundation is one of the largest and oldest charitable foundations in Estonia that provides support for the programs and initiatives of children's hospitals.  Since 2001, Children's Foundation has raised more than one million euros for children.

Activity
The Foundation provides funding for medical equipment for the Children's Clinic and for other children's departments of Tartu University Hospital Clinics.  It also supports treatment for children with rare diseases across Estonia, international lecturers’ visits to Estonia and international training courses for doctors and nurses.

The foundation helps supporters and volunteers to reach people in need.

In order to achieve its goals, Children's Foundation work is focused in three main areas of activity:
 Increasing growth of permanent foundation donors and supporters.
 Supporting children with severe and profound disabilities and their families.
 Inform people in need how to get help. Inform donors and supporters about donation opportunities.

The Foundation operates with a commitment to the principles stated in the "Code of Ethics of Estonian non-profit organizations".

Goals
The main goals of the Children's Foundation are: 
 to increase quality of medical care provided to children at Children's Clinic and other clinics of Tartu University Hospital where children get medical care;
 to detect and notify the public of problems in the provision of medical care for children;
 to raise public awareness of children's diseases in order to prevent its onset and development, to improve early detection of diseases and treatment results;
 helping children to overcome social problems which are caused by different diseases;
 teaching and promoting a healthy lifestyle to children, youngsters and family members.

The Foundation's mission is to raise concern, attention and care for those weakest and most vulnerable children among our fellow citizens.

Founders
The Children's Foundation was started in 2001 by 26 individuals: Priit Alamäe, Teet Jagomägi, Aino Järvesoo, Arno Justus, Mart Einasto, Jaan Kallas, Antti Kask, Malle Keis, Jaan Kelder, Jüri Kirss, Juhan Kolk, Aare Märtson, Robert Närska, Aune Past, Jaanus Pikani, Andres Piirsoo, Parvel Pruunsild, Uudo Reino, Piret Roos, Urmas Siigur, Olari Taal, Tiina Talvik, Raul Talvik, Jaano Uibo, Karin Varik, Merli Siff.

Board
Jaan Kelder (chairman) (AS Gildhall)
Antti Kask (Cramo Estonia AS)
Reet Hääl (Eesti Liisingühingute Liit)
Jaan Kallas (Põllumajanduse Registrite ja Informatsiooni Amet)
Andres Koern
Parvel Pruunsild (BIGBANK AS)
Merli Siff
Peeter Tulviste (University of Tartu)

References

External links

Blog
Photo gallery

2001 establishments in Estonia
Medical and health foundations
Organizations established in 2001
University of Tartu
Medical and health organizations based in Estonia